Chirag (Azerbaijani:  Çıraq) is an offshore oil field in the Caspian Sea, located  east of Baku, Azerbaijan and is a part of the larger Azeri-Chirag-Guneshli (ACG) project. The production, drilling and quarters (PDQ) platform Chirag 1 (EOP) has been in operation since 1997. Chirag 1 has been producing the Early Oil from the ACG field. West Chirag is planned as an extension of ACG project.

Chirag-1 and Early Oil Project 
It was recognized as the first large-scale oil project in the Caspian Sea region. The project involved investment of $200 million from big financial institutions such as World Bank's IFC and the EBRD
and included development of part of the Chirag oil field, namely refurbishment of an existing Chirag 1 platform, construction of new subsea pipelines, drilling of development and water injection wells; construction of Sangachal Terminal; construction of oil export terminal in Supsa, Georgia and completion of export pipelines and facilities in Azerbaijan and Georgia

Ownership 
The subsidiary of Amoco - Amoco Caspian Sea Petroleum Ltd was the operator for EOP. The partnership also included companies from United States, Russia, Turkey, United Kingdom, Norway, Japan and Azerbaijan.

Sponsors' share of the project costs are estimated at $800 million. IFC loans included five A loans (one to each one of borrowers) equalling $100 million in total and five B Loans, also $100 million in total.

Technical features 
Chirag 1 facilities include:
24-slot PDQ platform with water injection equipment
 long  oil pipeline to the Sangachal Terminal just south of Baku
 long  gas pipeline to the Oil Rocks offshore town
 long  gas pipeline to Central Azeri
Compression and water injection platform.  This part of the field is forecasted to produce until 2024.<ref>[http://www.offshore-technology.com/projects/acg/ Azeri-Chirag-Gunashli (ACG) Oil Field, Caspian Sea, Azerbaijan. Chirag-1 platform]</ref> Initially, the production from Chirag was exported through Baku–Novorossiysk pipeline. Once the Baku-Supsa pipeline became operational in 1999, the production was also directed through Georgia.

 West Chirag 

In March 2009, KBR was awarded a contract by BP on behalf of Azerbaijan International Operating Company to provide front-end engineering and design (FEED) and procurement services for the Chirag drilling platform. This is considered to be an expansion of ACG field development and is also known as Chirag Oil Project.KBR Press Release  In September 2010, construction of steel jacket for West Chirag'' platform will be started. Construction will be conducted by Baku Deepwater Jacket Factory named after Heydar Aliyev. Project management plans West Chirag production to start in the second quarter of 2014. Gas produced from Chirag is planned to be exported to Europe in 2016.

See also 

 Azeri-Chirag-Guneshli
 Baku–Tbilisi–Ceyhan pipeline
 Sangachal Terminal
 South Caucasus Pipeline
 Baku-Supsa pipeline
 Baku–Novorossiysk pipeline
 Nabucco pipeline
 Baku-Novo Filya gas pipeline
 Nakhichevan field

References

External links 
 Image showing Chirag within ACG fields

Oil fields of Azerbaijan
Oil fields of the Soviet Union
Caspian Sea
BP oil and gas fields
Itochu